Kakoli (also Romanized as Kākolī; also known as Kākolkī and Kākuli) is a village in Baghak Rural District, in the Central District of Tangestan County, Bushehr Province, Iran. At the 2006 census, its population was 332, in 79 families.

References 

Populated places in Tangestan County